The 2300 horsepower GE U23C diesel-electric locomotive model was first offered by GE in 1968, and featured a V-type 12 cylinder version of the standard GE FDL diesel motor.  Designed as a competitor to EMD's SD38 and SD39 series, it was intended for heavy transfer, drag and hump service where speed was not a priority.  Other than six tall hood doors matching six power assemblies per side, there are very few features which distinguish the U23C from the U30C.  The U30C has eight tall hood doors per side, a function of the V16 within.

A total of 73 units were built at Erie including 20 for export to Brazil. An additional 150 units were built by GE de Brazil from 1972–1976, some as kits supplied by GE.

Original owners

LS&I #2300 is preserved at the Arkansas Railroad Museum in Pine Bluff, Arkansas.

References

External links
 
 Sarberenyi, Robert. GE U23C Original Owners

U23C
C-C locomotives
Diesel-electric locomotives of the United States
Railway locomotives introduced in 1968
Standard gauge locomotives of the United States
5 ft 3 in gauge locomotives
Diesel-electric locomotives of Brazil